Manylovo is a rural locality (a village) in Tolshmenskoye Rural Settlement, Totemsky District, Vologda Oblast, Russia. The population was 49 as of 2002.

Geography 
Manylovo is located 73 km southwest of Totma (the district's administrative centre) by road. Manylovsky Pogost is the nearest rural locality.

References 

Rural localities in Tarnogsky District